Kyle Lorran Cooper (born 10 February 1989) is a South African rugby union player who represents the Newcastle Falcons in the English Premiership. Originally a hooker, he switched to prop ahead of 2020–21 season.

Rugby career

He joined English Premiership side Newcastle Falcons prior to the 2016–17 season.

Cooper made a slow start for the Falcons in his first season, only playing seven times. But an outstanding 2017-18 campaign saw Cooper elected as part of the Premiership Dream Team. Making more turnovers and beating more defenders than any other Hooker in the league, as he scored four tries in his 16 Premiership outings that year.

References

External links
Newcastle Falcons Profile

itsrugby.co.uk Profile

1989 births
Living people
South African rugby union players
Sharks (Currie Cup) players
Sharks (rugby union) players
Rugby union hookers
Rugby union players from Johannesburg
South African people of British descent
White South African people
South Africa Under-20 international rugby union players